The Libertarian Party of Virginia (LPVA) is the Virginia affiliate of the Libertarian Party.

Ballot laws

Ballot access laws
Virginia has one of the most restrictive ballot access laws in the United States. 

According to the Code of Virginia subsection 24.2-101, without "major party" status for automatic ballot access in Virginia, the LPVA has had to gather petition signatures to get on the ballot. The requirement for statewide elections, such as the U.S. Senate, is 10,000 signatures, including at least 400 from each of Virginia's 11 congressional districts. However, after the Virginia Republican presidential primary in 2012, Virginia lawmakers reduced the 10,000 signature requirement for presidential candidates by half. Now, according to Code of Virginia § 24.2-543, a petition to put a third-party or independent candidate on the ballot for U.S. President "shall be signed by at least 5,000 qualified voters and include signatures of at least 200 qualified voters from each congressional district." Thus, this revision makes it easier for presidential candidates to obtain ballot access; yet, the law still remains as a barrier to entry for minor party candidates.

For the Party to gain automatic ballot access as a major party, one of its nominated candidates must receive 10% of the vote in a statewide race. To obtain the signatures necessary to receive statewide ballot access in Virginia, it has been quoted to cost between $45,000 to $90,000. Should the LPVA meet the ten percent threshold, career journalist James Bacon noted: "Sparing the Libertarian Party the expense of petitioning to get its candidates on the ballot would allow it to husband its resources to help candidates campaign... That would be huge."

Ballot access litigation
The Libertarian Party of Virginia has, on multiple occasions,  taken legal action over Virginia's ballot access laws.

Libertarian Party of Virginia v. Judd
In 2013, the ACLU supported the Libertarian Party of Virginia, and contended that  the Libertarians would suffer "irreparable harm" given Virginia's ballot access laws.

In Libertarian Party of Virginia vs. Judd, the LPVA won the case regarding state residency requirements for petition circulators per the United States Court of Appeals for the Fourth Circuit on May 29, 2013. It was the first time a minor party had won a constitutional election law case in the Fourth Circuit since 1989 and 1988. In response to the Fourth Circuit's ruling, the State of Virginia via former Attorney General Ken Cuccinelli as well as several other states, like Oklahoma, submitted petitions to the Supreme Court of the United States asking to reverse the Fourth Circuit's decision. On December 2, 2013, the petitions against the Fourth Circuit's ruling were denied by the Supreme Court, and so the Libertarian Party of Virginia won the case regarding state residency requirements for petition circulators.

Sarvis v. Judd
In July 2014, The Rutherford Institute supported the Libertarian Party of Virginia and alleged Virginia ballot laws favored "the election chances of Democrat and Republican candidates at the expense of Libertarian Party and independent candidates."

In Sarvis vs. Judd a lawsuit was filed on behalf of the Libertarian Party of Virginia, several Libertarian Party candidates and an independent (non-party) candidate for public office in the November 2014 general election. The lawsuit challenged the Virginia State Board of Elections and the laws which require minor-party candidates to gather signatures on petitions to achieve ballot access as well as the laws which require minor-party and independent candidates' names to be placed below those of major-party candidates on the ballot.

Notable Virginia Libertarians
 Roger MacBride, the first presidential elector in U.S. history to cast a vote for a woman, and the presidential nominee for the Libertarian Party in the 1976 election.
 Robert Sarvis, the LPVA's 2013 gubernatorial candidate whose performance was the best performance for a minor party gubernatorial candidate in the U.S. South in nearly 40 years.

Office holders
The LPVA has and has had members elected and appointed to varying positions of government. These have included positions for: town councils; soil and water conservation committees; budget advisory committees; community leadership institutes; buildings, roads and grounds committees; and school boards.

Elections

1999 state elections

In 1999, Timothy Belton ran in the 65th district and got 22.8 percent of the vote. John Girardeau ran in the 72nd district and got 17.1 percent.

2000 presidential election

In the 2000 presidential election, the Libertarian nominee was Harry Browne, who gathered the requisite signatures to appear on the ballot in the general election. Browne received 0.6% of the vote in Virginia. In the 8th Congressional district, Ron Crickenberger received 1.3% of the vote for Representative. In the 11th Congressional district, Robert K. McBride received 2.0% of the vote for Representative.

2001 gubernatorial election

Bill Redpath ran for Governor against Mark Warner (D) and Mark Earley (R) receiving 0.8% of the vote. Gary Reams ran for Lieutenant Governor.

House of Delegates
Bill Peabody ran in the 39th district and got 0.9% of the vote. Micah Gray ran in the 41st district and got 15.9% of the vote. Christine Austen ran in 47th district and got 2.8% of the vote. Jim Simpson ran in the 51st district and got 2.3% of the vote. John H. Girardeau III ran in the 65th district and got 2.0% of the vote. Robert Stermer ran in the 96th district and got 1.0% of the vote.

Also in 2001, ACLU lawyers represented four Libertarian candidates (Redpath, Reams, Belton, and Girardeau) seeking to be listed on the ballot as Libertarians rather than independents. Joining them as plaintiffs in their federal lawsuit were two Virginia voters, John Buckley and Shelley Tamres.

2002 midterm election

Libertarian Ron Crickenberger ran as an independent in the 8th Congressional district, although he was referred to by the media, by the LPVA website, and by his own campaign website as a Libertarian candidate. He received 2.7% of the vote.

2004 presidential election

In the 2004 presidential election, the Libertarian nominee was Michael Badnarik, who received 0.4% of the vote in Virginia.

2005 state election
House of Delegates
Donald Ferguson ran in the 36th district and got 20.1% of the vote. Scott McPherson ran in the 37th district and got 1.5% of the vote. Charles Eby, Jr. ran in the 67th district and got 2.4% of the vote. Matthew Martin ran in the 73rd district and got 27.1% of the vote.

2006 midterm elections

Wilbur N. Wood III appeared on the ballot in Virginia's 10th congressional district receiving 0.9% of the vote.

2007 state elections

Senate of Virginia
Don Tabor ran in the 14th district and got 28.8% of the vote.

2008 elections

In the 2008 presidential election, the Libertarian nominee was Bob Barr, who gathered the requisite signatures to appear on the ballot in the general election. Barr received 0.3% of the vote in Virginia. Bill Redpath was the party nominee for U.S. Senate, and he appeared on the ballot receiving 0.6% of the vote. In the 1st congressional district, Libertarian nominee Nathan Larson appeared on the ballot and received 1.5% of the vote. He was expelled from the party in 2017.

2009 state elections

Matt Cholko ran in the 39th district and got 3.2% of the vote.

2010 midterm elections

Libertarian candidates appeared on the ballot in four U.S. House of Representatives elections in Virginia: James Quigley (3rd District), Stuart Bain (6th District), Bill Redpath (10th District), and David Dotson (11th District). Party candidates received a combined total of 23,681 votes (1.1%) statewide. (15,309 of those votes were from Bain, who received 9.2% in his district because there was no Democratic candidate running against Republican incumbent Bob Goodlatte.)

2011 state elections

Senate of Virginia
Don Tabor ran in the 14th district and got 28.8% of the vote.

House of Delegates
Michael Kane ran in the 41st district and got 31.3% of the vote. Glenn McGuire ran in the 95th district and got 22.7% of the vote.

2012 presidential election

Libertarian presidential nominee Gary Johnson received over 30,000 votes or approximately 0.8% of the vote in Virginia.

2013 state elections

House of Delegates
Six candidates ran for various seats in the Virginia House of Delegates. Jonathan Parrish earned 22.3% in the 23rd district. Patrick Hagerty obtained 3.4% in the 33rd district. Laura Delhomme garnered 22.9% of the vote in the 47th district. Anthony Tellez had 4.2% for the 53rd district. Christopher Sullivan received 5.6% in the 55th district, and Dan Foster obtained 3.7% in the 78th district. In total, there were over 15,000 votes cast for Libertarian candidates running for the Virginia House of Delegates in 2013.

Gubernatorial

Robert Sarvis, the Libertarian gubernatorial nominee, became the fourth minor party nominee in forty years to get on the Virginia ballot. On election day, Sarvis obtained 146,084 votes, or approximately 6.5% of the total vote cast, a number nearly three times the size of McAuliffe's victory margin over Cuccinelli and nearly five times better than Libertarian presidential candidate Gary Johnson from the year before. Sarvis' performance was the best performance among any Libertarian running for Governor of Virginia, among the top three strongest among any Libertarian candidate running in a state gubernatorial election, and the best performance for a third party gubernatorial candidate in the U.S. South in nearly 40 years.

2014 midterm elections
U.S. Senate

U.S. House of Representatives

Candidates for the U.S. House:

1st District: Xavian Draper
2nd District: Allen Knapp
3rd District: Justin Upshaw
4th District: Bo Brown
5th District: Paul Jones
6th District: Will Hammer
7th District: James Carr
8th District: Jeffrey Carson
9th District: Matthew Edwards
10th District: Bill Redpath
11th District: Marc Harrold

For the first time in its history, the Libertarian Party of Virginia had a full slate of candidates for the U.S. Congress in Virginia. Collectively, the candidates submitted well over 30,000 signatures by the June 10th deadline. This would have been the first time any party other than the Democratic and Republican Parties ran a full slate for U.S. House in Virginia since 1916; however, Xavian Draper, Allen Knapp, Justin Upshaw, and Matthew Edwards did not submit enough valid signatures to qualify for a position on the ballot.

Therefore, seven candidates ran for various seats in Congress. Bo Brown earned 2.2% in the 4th district. Paul Jones had 2.1% in the 5th district. Will Hammer garnered 12.3% in the 6th district. James Carr obtained 2.1% in the 7th district. Jeffrey Carson received 2.2% in the 8th district. Bill Redpath had 1.5% in the 10th district, and Marc Harrold earned 1.7% in the 11th district. In total, there were over 47,000 votes cast for Libertarian candidates running for Congress in 2014.

2015 state elections
House of Delegates
Four candidates ran for various seats in the Virginia House of Delegates. Will Hammer earned 23.9% in the 20th district. Mark Anderson had 3.6% in the 33rd district. Andy Bakker garnered 4.5% in the 46th district, and Brian Suojanen obtained 2.1% in the 87th district. In total, there were nearly 5,000 votes cast for Libertarian candidates running for the Virginia House of Delegates.

Senate of Virginia
Carl Loser ran for the Senate of Virginia in the 10th district. Loser had 1.0% of the vote, or 527 votes.

2016 presidential election

Gary Johnson got 3.0% of the vote.

2017 state elections

Candidates running in 2017 include Will Hammer, in the 20th district; Michael Millner in the 22nd district; and Terry Hurst in the 89th district.

2018 midterm election

Matt Waters was the Libertarian nominee for the U.S. Senate. He received 1.84% of the vote.

2020 presidential election

Libertarian presidential nominee Jo Jorgensen received 1.45% of the vote in Virginia.

See also

 Libertarian Party (United States)
 Libertarianism.org
 Institute for Justice
 Institute for Humane Studies
 Campaign for Liberty
 Young Americans for Liberty
 Mercatus Center
 Democratic Party of Virginia
 Green Party of Virginia
 Republican Party of Virginia
 List of Libertarian Party of Virginia statewide and federal candidates

References

Virginia
Political parties in Virginia
1971 establishments in Virginia
2022 disestablishments in Virginia